Górnik Zabrze competed in Ekstraklasa and this season's edition of the Polish Cup.

Players

Competitions

Ekstraklasa

Standings

Results summary

Results by round

Matches

Polish Cup

References

Górnik Zabrze
Górnik Zabrze